The following are lists of past and current players of the Chicago Bears professional American football team.

Historic teams

Partial inaugural (1919) roster
The following is a partial roster for the 1919 season, when the team was known as the Decatur Staleys.

Super Bowl rosters
The following  lists are lists of the Bears Super Bowl teams.

Super Bowl XX championship roster

Super Bowl XLI runner-up roster

Current roster

First-round draft picks

The following list is of the Bears first-round draft picks since 1936.

Pro Football Hall of Famers

The following is a list of Pro Football Hall of Famers that have been a major contributor to the Bears, along with the year of their induction.

Retired numbers
The Bears have retired fourteen uniform numbers, which is the most in the NFL, and ranks fourth behind the NBA's Boston Celtics (21), MLB's New York Yankees (20), and NHL's Montreal Canadiens (15) for the most in the four major professional sports leagues in the United States and Canada.

Top 100 greatest Bears of all-time

In honor of the team centennial anniversary, on May 20, 2019, the Chicago Bears have unveiled the Top 100 players in franchise history, as voted on by Hall of Fame writers Don Pierson and Dan Pompei, two of the most famous journalists that have ever covered the club in their long history. At the time of the publish, the list included 27 Pro Football Hall of Famers, while two more inductees would join in the 2020 class (Jim Covert and Ed Sprinkle).

Among the 100 Greatest, four active players made the list, including safety Eddie Jackson (96), defensive lineman Akiem Hicks (75), offensive lineman Kyle Long (74) and highest-ranked active Bear was Khalil Mack (60), who played only one season with the team. Long would retire the following year.

On later date, Chicagobears.com released a list titled "Top 10: Best of the rest", that featured the top 10 snubs from the centennial list. The players include (in a following order): Alex Brown, Thomas Jones, Dave Whitsell, Curtis Conway, Tim Jennings, Leslie Frazier, Roberto Garza, Marty Booker, Nathan Vasher and William Perry.

 Pro Football Hall of Fame inductee.
 Pro Football Hall of Fame finalist.

All-Time Team
During the week of June 3, 2019 the All-Time Team was announced in parts each day starting with the All-Time defensive players, followed by the All-Time specialists and then the All-Time offensive players.

Larry Mayer of the Chicagobears.com would later state, that according to the voters "if they had included a long-snapper on the team it would have been Patrick Mannelly".

Offense

Defense

Special teams

Starting quarterbacks

References

List
Chicago B
Players